The Sound School is a regional vocational aquaculture center situated in the City Point neighborhood of New Haven, Connecticut.

References

External links
 

Schools in New Haven, Connecticut
Public high schools in Connecticut